Fernando Huergo (born 31 July 1908, date of death unknown) was an Argentine fencer. He competed in the individual and team sabre events at the 1948 Summer Olympics. Huergo won a silver medal at the 1951 Pan American Games and a bronze medal at the 1955 Pan American Games. He was also the President of the Argentine Olympic Committee from 1955 to 1957.

References

External links
 

1908 births
Year of death missing
Argentine male sabre fencers
Olympic fencers of Argentina
Fencers at the 1948 Summer Olympics
Pan American Games medalists in fencing
Pan American Games silver medalists for Argentina
Pan American Games bronze medalists for Argentina
Fencers at the 1951 Pan American Games
Fencers at the 1955 Pan American Games
Medalists at the 1951 Pan American Games
Medalists at the 1955 Pan American Games
20th-century Argentine people